July 31 - Eastern Orthodox liturgical calendar - Aug. 2

All fixed commemorations below are observed on August 14 by Eastern Orthodox Churches on the Old Calendar.

For August 1st, Orthodox Churches on the Old Calendar commemorate the Saints listed on July 19.

Feasts
 Procession of the Precious Wood of the Life-giving Cross of Jesus Christ.
 The Feast to the All-Merciful Saviour and the Most Holy Mother of God (especially in churches dedicated to Christ).
 Beginning of the Dormition Fast.

Saints
 Holy Seven Maccabees: 
 Martyrs: Abimus, Antoninus, Gurias, Eleazar, Eusabonus, Alimus, Marcellus, their mother Solomonia, and their teacher Eleazar (166 BC)
 Holy Nine Martyrs of Perge in Pamphylia: 
 Leontius, Attius, Alexander, Cindeus, Minsitheus, Cyriacus, Mineon, Catanus, Eucleus (3rd century)
 Martyr Papas the New.
 Martyr Eleazar.
 Martyr Cyricus, by beheading.
 Martyr Theodore, by the sword.
 Martyr Polyeuctus, by being buried alive in manure.
 Venerable Martyr Elessa of Kythira (375)
 Saint Timothy of Proconnesus, Wonderworker, Archbishop of Proconnesus (6th century)

Pre-Schism Western saints
 Martyrs Menas, Menais, and others of England.
 Child-martyr Justin, venerated in Louvre near Paris in France (c. 290)
 Saint Nemesius, a saint venerated near Lisieux in France.
 Saint Leus of Viguenza, a priest whose relics were honoured in Viguenza in Italy (4th century)
 Saint Verus, Bishop of Vienne; he attended the Council of Arles in 314 (c. 314)
 Saint Eusebius of Vercelli, Bishop (371)
 Saint Exuperius of Bayeux, first Bishop of Bayeux in France, he is honoured in Corbeil (405)
 Saint Ríoch, a nephew of St. Patrick, early Irish Christian missionary and Abbot of Innisboffin in Ireland (c. 490)
 Saint Almedha (Eluned, Eled, Elevetha), suffered martyrdom on a hill near Brecon in Wales (5th century)
 Saint Severus, a priest of noble family, famous for his charity, honoured from time immemorial in the village that bears his name, St Sever de Rustan (c. 500)
 Saints Friard (Friardus of Vindumitta), and Secundel (Secundellus) deacon, hermits on the Isle of Vindomitte near Nantes in Gaul (c. 577)  (see also: August 2)
 Virgin-martyr Sidwell of Exeter (Sativola) (6th century)
 Saint Kenneth (Cenydd, Kined), a hermit who made his cell among the rocks in the Gower peninsula in Wales at a place later called Llangenydd after him (6th century)
 Saint Peregrinus, a pilgrim from Ireland who returning from a pilgrimage to the Holy Land settled as a hermit near Modena in Italy (643)
 Saint Jonatus, a monk at Elnone in Belgium; Abbot of Marchiennes (c. 643-652) and then of Elnone Abbey (c. 652-659)
 Saint Mary the Consoler, sister of St Anno, Bishop of Verona in Italy (8th century)
 Saint Æthelwold of Winchester, Bishop of Winchester (984)

Post-Schism Orthodox saints

New martyrs and confessors
 New Hieromartyr Basil, Archbishop of Chernigov (1918)
 New Hieromartyr Demetrius Pavsky, Priest (1937)

Other commemorations
 Baptism of Rus' (1 August 988)
 Finding of the relics (1882) of Bishop Nestor (Zakkis) of the Aleutians and Alaska (1882)
 Repose of Abbess Alexia of Nizhni-Novgorod (1940)
 Uncovering of the relics (1995) of the Venerable Sophia of Suzdal (1542)

Icon gallery

Notes

References

Sources
 August 1/14. Orthodox Calendar (PRAVOSLAVIE.RU).
 August 14 / August 1. HOLY TRINITY RUSSIAN ORTHODOX CHURCH (A parish of the Patriarchate of Moscow).
 August 1. OCA - The Lives of the Saints.
 August 1. Latin Saints of the Orthodox Patriarchate of Rome.
 The Roman Martyrology. Transl. by the Archbishop of Baltimore. Last Edition, According to the Copy Printed at Rome in 1914. Revised Edition, with the Imprimatur of His Eminence Cardinal Gibbons. Baltimore: John Murphy Company, 1916. pp. 228–229.
 Rev. Richard Stanton. A Menology of England and Wales, or, Brief Memorials of the Ancient British and English Saints Arranged According to the Calendar, Together with the Martyrs of the 16th and 17th Centuries. London: Burns & Oates, 1892. pp. 375–377.

 Greek Sources
 Great Synaxaristes:  1 ΑΥΓΟΥΣΤΟΥ. ΜΕΓΑΣ ΣΥΝΑΞΑΡΙΣΤΗΣ.
  Συναξαριστής. 1 Αυγούστου. ECCLESIA.GR. (H ΕΚΚΛΗΣΙΑ ΤΗΣ ΕΛΛΑΔΟΣ).

 Russian Sources
  14 августа (1 августа). Православная Энциклопедия под редакцией Патриарха Московского и всея Руси Кирилла (электронная версия). (Orthodox Encyclopedia - Pravenc.ru).

August in the Eastern Orthodox calendar